The canton of Perreux is a French former administrative division located in the department of Loire and the Rhône-Alpes region. It was disbanded following the French canton reorganisation which came into effect in March 2015. It had 16,565 inhabitants (2012).

The canton comprised the following communes:

Combre
Commelle-Vernay
Le Coteau
Coutouvre
Montagny
Notre-Dame-de-Boisset
Parigny
Perreux
Saint-Vincent-de-Boisset

See also
Cantons of the Loire department

References

Former cantons of Loire (department)
2015 disestablishments in France
States and territories disestablished in 2015